Borehamwood (historically also Boreham Wood) is a town in southern Hertfordshire, England,  from Charing Cross. Borehamwood has a population of 31,074, and is within the London commuter belt. The town's film and TV studios are commonly known as Elstree Studios.

History
One of the earliest mentions of Bosci de Boreham (Wood of Boreham), is in 1188:
"In 1188 Pope Clement granted to the kitchen of the monastery the whole land of Elstree. He also gave to the Abbey the wood of Boreham for the feeding of the swine."

In 1776, the House of Lords granted:
"An Act for dividing and closing the Common or Waste Ground, called Boreham Wood Common, in the Parish of Elstree otherwise Idletree, in the County of Hertford."

Borehamwood was historically part of the parish of Elstree. A separate ecclesiastical parish of "All Saints, Boreham Wood" was created on 26 February 1909, covering the part of Elstree parish east of the Midland Railway. Despite this change to the ecclesiastical boundaries, Borehamwood remained part of the civil parish of Elstree. The name of the civil parish was changed to Elstree and Borehamwood on 24 February 1982. The ecclesiastical parishes of Borehamwood and Elstree were reunited on 1 April 2005, also under the name "Elstree and Borehamwood".

From the 1920s onwards, the town became known as one of the main centres of the UK film, and later television, industries due to the presence of production studios.

Following the Second World War, the town's population greatly increased, with large areas of council housing set up for displaced Londoners, many of which are now in private ownership. Fast train connections to central London have resulted in the town becoming a primarily residential suburb. In 1946, the Admiralty started to build highly secret high-performance electronic digital computers at Borehamwood in a redundant wartime factory, firstly for the purpose of real-time gunnery control, and later for surface-to-air guided weapons and missiles, and for specialist cryptography and code-breaking computers for GCHQ.

Borehamwood is currently undergoing a substantial housing transformation which has seen hundreds of new homes built over the last five years. Two further developments are being built and more are expected.

In addition to the studios, the town is home to many retail shops, hotels, restaurants, offices and light industry. The hotels cater mainly to tourists visiting the Elstree Studios, attendees of the television shows being recorded in the Elstree Studios, and London visitors due to the proximity to London and the considerable lower accommodation rates.

There is one weekly newspaper, the Borehamwood & Elstree Times.

Transport

On the west side of Borehamwood is Elstree & Borehamwood railway station (TfL Zone 6) served by trains operated by Govia Thameslink Railway on the Thameslink route.

Metroline for London buses runs its number 107 service through the town from New Barnet to Edgware and back, whilst London Sovereign for London buses operates the number 292 bus service going into north-west London. The Uno (bus company) run a bus service that stops at Borehamwood (route 601) going to Welwyn Garden City via St Albans and back. Intalink operate a bus service to other parts of Hertfordshire.

Geography

Climate
Borehamwood experiences an oceanic climate (Köppen climate classification Cfb) similar to almost all of the rest of the United Kingdom.

Film industry

Since the 1914, the town has been home to several film studios and many shots of its streets are included in final cuts of 20th century British films. This earned it the nickname of the "British Hollywood". Whilst most of these studios, collectively known as "Elstree Studios", have now closed, two still remain.

Many films were shot at the studios on Shenley Road including The Dam Busters (1955), Star Wars (1977, and subsequent films in the franchise), Moby Dick (1956), Summer Holiday (1963), and The Shining (1980) starring Jack Nicholson, some of the Indiana Jones films. The facility was partly demolished in the 1980s to make way for a Tesco Extra supermarket on one side and an office block complex on the other.

The area between the supermarket and the office blocks is all that remains of the original studio, which has been much reduced in size and usefulness to production companies as a result. The Shenley Road Studios were later used for the TV series Who Wants to Be a Millionaire? and Big Brother, as well as several major feature films. The Inspector Morse TV series' production offices were based in the studios and, although the series was set in Oxford, several exterior locations (banks, shops etc.) were filmed in the streets of Borehamwood.

The former British National Studios off Clarendon Road, referred to locally as "The Douglas Fairbanks studios" (which were bought by Lew Grade's ATV in May 1958), are now the BBC Elstree Centre. The studios have, over the years, been home to Alfred Hitchcock's film Blackmail, Jim Henson's TV series The Muppet Show was also produced there, and now BBC's popular soap, EastEnders and their medical drama Holby City. An episode of Judge John Deed included scenes of the Tesco Extra, but with Borehamwood crossed out and Lewes written in its place.

Several other studios including the Gate Studios and the Danziger Studios at nearby Elstree have been demolished. The Metro-Goldwyn-Mayer British Studios complex (demolished in the early 1970s) saw the production of many films, including 2001: A Space Odyssey (1968), Where Eagles Dare (1968) and Goodbye, Mr. Chips (1969), as well as ITV television series such as The Prisoner (1967–68).

The newer Millennium Studios were situated on Elstree Way, Borehamwood.

Notable companies
The UK headquarters of Pizza Hut restaurants is based in the town, the head office of the delivery portion having moved to nearby St Albans in 2015; and, until 2003, so were the headquarters of the United Kingdom subsidiary of T-Mobile, with both being based in the office blocks standing on part of what used to be the old Elstree Studios. Regent Inns has its head office on Elstree Way. George Wimpey also has offices within the town. The takeaway delivery company Just Eat also has an office in the town in the same complex as Pizza Hut. Since 2015, Borehamwood has also been home to the UK subsidiary of the olive oil brand, Filippo Berio.

Notable people

Alfie Bass Lived in Well End, Borehamwood until his death in 1987.
Jaye Davidson, actor, grew up here and went to Hillside Comprehensive School (now Yavneh College).
Sir Ray Davies, actor, director, producer, guitarist, primary vocalist and songwriter for The Kinks, lived in Borehamwood during the late 1960s.
Den Dover (born 1938), Member of the European Parliament, lives in Borehamwood.
John Forgeham, lived in Borehamwood during the late 1970s and early 1980s.
Prof. Angus Charles Graham (1919–1991), Professor of Classical Chinese, London University, 1971–84, lived in Borehamwood.
Sir Robert Holland (c.1283–1328), nobleman, was murdered in Borehamwood on 15 Oct 1328.
Marilyn, early 80s New Romantic singer went to St Teresa's Catholic School
Shona McGarty, plays Whitney Dean in EastEnders.
Tim Sherwood, former footballer and manager.
James Hay Stevens (1913–1973) FRAeS. Aviation journalist, editor Aircraft Engineering (1945–1957), illustrator and pilot lived in Borehamwood. He developed the 1:72nd scale model used by Airfix and other toy manufacturers.
John Frederick Tayler (1802–1889), watercolour painter, and President of the then-called Old Society, was born on 30 April 1802 at Borehamwood.

Sport and recreation

The first third of the Watling Chase Timberland Trail stretches from Elstree & Borehamwood railway station up to Shenley. South of the town is a large area of grassland and trees called Woodcock Hill Village Green. Section 16 of the London Outer Orbital Path (London Loop) runs adjacent to the town, starting in Elstree and through Scratchwood towards the London Borough of Barnet.

Borehamwood is home to Boreham Wood FC, Arsenal Women and Watford FC Reserves who play their home games at Meadow Park. There are several parks in the area. Aberford Park is featured with the source of the brook which has been artificially made to look like a lake. Meadow Park includes a large playing field, tennis courts and basketball courts.

Borehamwood has a large shopping area called Borehamwood Shopping Park, featuring large stores such as Marks & Spencer Simply Food, Next, WH Smith, Boots, and more recently JD Sports, which took the place of JJB Sports, and newly added Poundland, Lidl, Metro Bank, and Pets at Home.

The hamlet of Well End has a notable pub, the Mops and Brooms, reputedly the site of a battle between travellers and village folk.
Adjacent to the pub is a much older building: Nelson Cottage (c.1600) is now a private residence but was the original Mops and Brooms alehouse. It was renamed the Lord Nelson c.1840–50 and traded under that name until its closure in 1932 and replacement by the current pub, which eventually reverted to the older name.

The Borehamwood & Elstree Times is a privately owned, online-only local newspaper covering the local and adjacent area. The Town Crier is a quarterly, council-run community publication for Elstree & Borehamwood residents.

Education
Borehamwood has a number of primary schools, including Cowley Hill Primary School, Woodlands Primary School and Parkside School. Secondary schools include Hertswood Academy, Elstree Screen Arts Academy and Yavneh College. Independent schools include Haberdashers' Aske's Boys' and Girls' schools.

Oaklands College has a site in Borehamwood, where it offers a small range of full and part-time courses.

The TV series Grange Hill was filmed at Hillside School in Borehamwood (as well as BBC Elstree Centre) from 1985 to 1990.

Nearby towns and villages

 Arkley
 Barnet Gate
 Edgware
 Elstree
 High Barnet
 Mill Hill
 Ridge
 Radlett
 Shenley
 Stanmore
 Well End
 Aldenham

Twin towns
 Fontenay-aux-Roses, France
 Offenburg, Germany
 Huainan, China

References by media and the arts
Borehamwood is the town upon which one of three maps is based in the game Urban Dead. This map was released as part of the promotional campaign for the release of British writer Charlie Brooker's Dead Set (set in the Big Brother house in Borehamwood).

References

External links
 Elstree & Borehamwood Town Council
 Borehammwood at Hertfordshire County Council
 Borehamwood at the BBC Domesday Project

 
Towns in Hertfordshire
Hertsmere